Esperando nada is the second album by Chilean singer Nicole. It was released in November, 1994.

Track listing
 "Mundo Perdido" - 4:17
 "Dame Luz" - 5:00
 "Esperando Nada" - 4:14
 "Sin Gamulán" - 3:45
 "Territorios" - 3:54
 "Va A Llover" - 4:38
 "Extraño Ser" - 3:42
 "Sigo Buscándote" - 5:02
 "Sólo El Mar" - 4:48
 "Cuando Yo Me Transformé" - 2:16
 "Tres Pies Al Gato" - 4:17
 "Con Este Sol" - 3:25

References 

Nicole (Chilean singer) albums
1994 albums